Daniel Dezeuze (born 1942) is a French artist and a founding member of the French group of artists called Supports/Surfaces. This group (made up of Dezeuze, Claude Viallat, Patrick Saytour, Louis Cane, André-Pierre Arnal, Vincent Bioulès, Noêl Dolla, Jean-Pierre Pincemin, André Valensi, Marc Devade, Toni Grand, and Bernard Pagès) started to form in 1966. Their common concern was a desire to deconstruct painting in order to re-examine its history and question its nature. Colour is a fundamental question in many of their works. They frequently used non-traditional materials and referred to other non-western cultures.

Biography
Dezeuze was born in Alès, Gard. He studied Spanish literature at the university in Montpellier while attending classes at the art college. After spending several years abroad (Spain, Mexico, Canada) he finished his doctorate in Comparative Literature at the Sorbonne in Paris in 1970.

Dezeuze's radical work from 1967 (Stretcher covered in plastic film) is in the collection of the Centre Pompidou in Paris and was shown at the Guggenheim Museum as part of the Exhibition of Masterpieces from the Centre Pompidou.

His work over the years has been extremely varied in materials (wood, gauze, found objects, polyethylene etc.) and in tone, from the austere rigour of his flexible wooden ladders of the 1970s, to the ethereal lightness of his gauze pieces going on to the playfulness of his colourful Peintures qui perlent (Beading Paintings) which are painted wooden cubes and beads attached to a rigid framework.

There are two main directions in his work: the first, his deconstruction of painting and its components (Ladders, Trellises, Cut Out Gauzes, Pavilions etc.) and the second, his creation of series of objects (Arms, Gathering Devices, and Receptacles) which evoke humanity's perennial activities.

Dezeuze's drawings also can be grouped in these same two directions with the addition of his sensitive and delightful evocations of nature in his series La Vie Amoureuse des Plantes (subject of an exhibition at the Centre Pompidou in 1993), his numerous and colourful Butterflies and enigmatic Grotesques.

His exhibitions have been numerous in France and abroad. He exhibited regularly at the Yvon Lambert Gallery in Paris from 1971 until 1991 and since that date at the Daniel Templon Gallery in Paris.

Daniel Dezeuze also has a considerable body of written work. In 1971 he founded the review Peinture, cahiers théoriques with Louis Cane and Marc Devade with the help of the review Tel Quel. His theoretical articles from this review are included in the publication from the Ecole Nationale des Beaux-Arts de Paris of his writings. Also included are several interviews and a great part of his published poetry.

Among his commissions must be included the mosaic floor in the Church of St. Laurent in Puy-en-Velay, his sculpture in the Tuileries Gardens, the optic fibre sculpture in the Toulouse subway and his redecoration, incorporating several of his works, of the Hôtel du Sully in Paris.

Selected exhibitions

1998 Carré d'Art -musée d'Art contemporain, Nîmes
1999 Galerie Daniel Templon, Paris
2001 La Chaufferie et Musée d'Art moderne et Contemporain, Strasbourg
2002 Galerie Daniel Templon, Paris. Galerie John Dekkers, La Haye (Pays-Bas)
2003 Galerie Fernand Léger (Credac), Ivry-sur-Seine
FRAC Bourgogne, Dijon
Espace d'art contemporain du domaine départemental du Château d'O, Montpellier
2005 Espace d'art contemporain Gustave Fayet, Sérignan
2006 Armes et Scènes de guerre Château de Salses (66) dépôt permanent
2007 Galerie Hambursin-Boisanté, Montpellier. Casa de Francia, Mexico (Mexique). Granville Gallery (Normandie). Galerie Art Attitude Hervé Bize, Nancy
2008 Galerie Daniel Templon. Kringst-Ernst Gallery, Cologne. Musée Paul Valéry, Sète
2017 Daniel Dezeuze - a retrospective,  Musée de Grenoble, France
2019 From a certain angle, Galerie Templon, Paris, France 
2021 Screens/Tables: Variations,  Galerie Templon, Paris, France

External links
 Official website of Daniel Dezeuze
 Rencontre - Débat avec Daniel Dezeuze à Montpellier

References

1942 births
Living people
People from Alès
20th-century French painters
20th-century French male artists
French male painters
21st-century French painters
21st-century French male artists
French draughtsmen
University of Paris alumni
20th-century French sculptors
French male sculptors